Manchester United Football Club Under-21s is the most senior of Manchester United's youth teams and the club's former reserve team. They play in the Premier League 2, the highest tier of the Professional Development League. The team is effectively Manchester United's second-string side, but is limited to five outfield players and one goalkeeper over the age of 21 per game following the introduction of new regulations from the 2022–23 season, a change from three outfield players over age 23 introduced in 2016–17. The age limit previously was again 21, from 2012–13.

They were champions of the former Premier Reserve League five times (in 2002, 2005, 2006, 2010 and 2012) between its introduction in 1999 and its dissolution in 2012. The team also won the 2012–13 Professional U21 Development League 1 in its inaugural season, and again in 2015 and 2016. The team also participates in the regional Manchester Senior Cup and the Lancashire Senior Cup. From the 2019–20 edition, they also participate in the nationwide EFL Trophy along with senior teams from levels 3 and 4 of the English football league system, as teams from levels 1 and 2 are restricted to players aged 21 and under.

The team's current manager is Mark Dempsey, who took over from Neil Wood in 2022. Wood managed the team from 2019 until 2022. Ricky Sbragia had been manager since 2017 and had also been manager for the reserves between 2002–2005. Sbragia had taken over from Nicky Butt, an academy graduate in the 1990s who played for United until 2004. Butt held the role on an interim basis for the 2016–17 season after Warren Joyce was appointed Wigan Athletic manager on 2 November 2016. Joyce, who took over from Ole Gunnar Solskjær as manager of the reserves in December 2010, was previously the manager of Royal Antwerp, Manchester United's feeder club in Belgium.

From November 2008 to August 2013, the team played its home matches at Moss Lane in Altrincham, the home of Altrincham F.C. For the 2013–14 Under-21 Premier League season, the team has played the majority of its home matches at Salford City Stadium in Barton-upon-Irwell. Since 2014–15, the team play its home matches at Leigh Sports Village. Rules set out by the Premier League state that at least three home league games per season must be played at the club's main stadium, Old Trafford. In previous seasons, the team has played at the Victoria Stadium, the home of Northwich Victoria, and Ewen Fields, the home of Hyde United.

Manchester United also has an Under-18s team that plays in the Premier League Under-18s Group 2 and the FA Youth Cup. The under-18s play their home games at the club's Trafford Training Centre in Carrington.

Under-21s

Current squad

Out on loan

Manager history

Honours
Professional Development League 1
Winners (3): 2012–13, 2014–15, 2015–16
Premier Reserve League Northern
Winners (5): 2002, 2005, 2006, 2010, 2012
Premier Reserve League National Playoff
Winners (4): 2005, 2006, 2010, 2012
Central League North: 9
1913, 1921, 1939, 1947, 1956, 1960, 1994, 1996, 1997
Central League Division 1 West: 1
2005
Central League Cup: 1
2005
Manchester Senior Cup: 27
1908, 1910, 1912, 1913, 1920, 1924, 1926, 1931, 1934, 1936, 1937, 1939, 1948, 1955, 1957, 1959, 1964, 1999, 2000, 2001, 2004, 2006, 2008, 2009, 2011, 2012, 2013, 2014
Lancashire Senior Cup: 15
1898, 1913, 1914, 1920 (shared), 1929, 1938, 1941, 1943, 1946, 1951, 1969, 2008, 2009, 2012, 2013

Academy

The Manchester United Academy was established in 1998, following the reorganisation of youth football in England, but has roots stretching all the way back to the 1930s with the establishment of the Manchester United Junior Athletic Club (MUJAC). and has been responsible for producing some of Manchester United's greatest ever players, including the club's top five all-time appearance makers, Ryan Giggs, Bobby Charlton, Bill Foulkes, Paul Scholes and Gary Neville, and the new wave of home-grown talents known as Fergie's Fledglings. The current academy is based at the club's Aon Training Complex, an  site in the Manchester suburb of Carrington.

The Manchester United youth team is statistically the most successful in English football, with nine players in the English football Hall of Fame (Duncan Edwards, Sir Bobby Charlton, George Best, Nobby Stiles, Mark Hughes,Paul Scholes, David Beckham and Johnny Giles). Manchester United also have the best FA Youth Cup record, winning on 10 occasions out of 14 final appearances.

The academy comprises age-group teams ranging from Under-9s up to the flagship Under-18s, who currently compete in Group C of the Premier Academy League and in the FA Youth Cup. The Under-16s and Under-18s typically play their academy league games at 11am on Saturday mornings at Carrington, while Youth Cup games are generally played at either Altrincham's Moss Lane ground (where the under-23s play their home games) or the club's 76,000-capacity Old Trafford home, in order to cater for the greater number of supporters these fixtures attract.

In 2007, Manchester United Under-18s won the Champions Youth Cup, intended to be an analogue to the FIFA Club World Cup for youth sides, beating Juventus 1–0 in the final in Malaysia. It was their first and only title, since the tournament was scrapped after only one edition.

Current squad
As of 2 September 2022

Honours
U18 Premier League – National Champions: 1
2012–13
U18 Premier League – Northern Champions: 1
2017–18
Premier Academy League U18 (Group): 3
1998–99, 2000–01, 2009–10
FA Youth Cup: 11
1953, 1954, 1955, 1956, 1957, 1964, 1992, 1995, 2003, 2011, 2022
Blue Stars/FIFA Youth Cup: 18
1954, 1957, 1959, 1960, 1961, 1962, 1965, 1966, 1968, 1969, 1975, 1976, 1978, 1979, 1981, 1982, 2004, 2005
Champions Youth Cup: 1 
2007
Milk Cup: 6
1991, 2003, 2008, 2009, 2013, 2014
Lancashire League Division One: 12
1954–55, 1983–84, 1984–85, 1986–87, 1987–88, 1989–90, 1990–91, 1992–93, 1994–95, 1995–96, 1996–97, 1997–98
Lancashire League Division Two: 5
1964–65, 1969–70, 1971–72, 1988–89, 1996–97
Lancashire League Division One Supplementary Cup: 4
1954–55, 1955–56, 1959–60, 1963–64
Lancashire League Division Two Supplementary Cup: 10
1955–56, 1956–57, 1959–60, 1961–62, 1963–64, 1964–65, 1965–66, 1969–70, 1971–72, 1976–77

Staff

Notable youth team players
The following is a list of players who have played in the Manchester United youth team (U16–U18) and represented a country (not necessarily their country of birth) at full international level. Players who are currently playing at Manchester United, or for another club on loan from Manchester United, are highlighted in bold.

 Stan Ackerley
 Adnan Ahmed
 Arthur Albiston
 John Aston Sr.
 Ray Baartz
 Phil Bardsley
 David Beckham
 George Best
 Clayton Blackmore
 Jackie Blanchflower
 Mark Bosnich
 Robbie Brady
 Evandro Brandão
 Febian Brandy
 Shay Brennan
 Ronnie Briggs
 Wes Brown
 Alex Bruce
 Francis Burns
 Nicky Butt
 Roger Byrne
 Fraizer Campbell
 Johnny Carey
 Joe Carolan
 Craig Cathcart
 Bobby Charlton
 James Chester
 Tom Cleverley
 Kenny Cooper
 Hugh Curran
 Mats Møller Dæhli
 Alan Davies
 Simon Davies
 Danny Drinkwater
 Eamon Dunphy
 Mike Duxbury
 Duncan Edwards
 Magnus Wolff Eikrem
 Anthony Elanga
 Corry Evans
 Jonny Evans
 Darren Fletcher
 Bill Foulkes
 Timothy Fosu-Mensah
 Ethan Galbraith
 Darron Gibson
 Ryan Giggs
 Johnny Giles
 Keith Gillespie
 Don Givens
 Shaun Goater
 Pierluigi Gollini
 Johnny Gorman
 Kenji Gorré
 Brian Greenhoff
 Mason Greenwood
 David Healy
 Tom Heaton
 Dean Henderson
 Jackie Hennessy
 Danny Higginbotham
 Mark Hughes
 Phil Hughes
 Nicholas Ioannou
 Zidane Iqbal
 Saidy Janko
 Adnan Januzaj
 David Johnson
 Sam Johnstone
 Michael Keane
 Will Keane
 Brian Kidd
 Joshua King
 Jovan Kirovski
 Tom Lawrence
 Dylan Levitt
 Jesse Lingard
 Shaun Lowther
 Jon Macken
 David McCreery
 Luke McCullough
 Wilf McGuinness
 Sammy McIlroy
 Alan McLoughlin
 Sammy McMillan
 Paddy McNair
 Paul McShane
 Scott McTominay
 Hannibal Mejbri
 Jackie Mooney
 Kalam Mooniaruck
 Johnny Morris
 Ravel Morrison
 Philip Mulryne
 Colin Murdock
 Daniel Nardiello
 Gary Neville
 Phil Neville
 Jimmy Nicholl
 Jimmy Nicholson
 Oliver Norwood
 Lee O'Connor
 Kieran O'Hara
 John O'Shea
 Peter O'Sullivan
 Matthew Olosunde
 Stan Pearson
 David Pegg
 Andreas Pereira
 Anthony Pilkington
 Gerard Piqué
 David Platt
 Paul Pogba
 Marcus Rashford
 Kieran Richardson
 Jimmy Rimmer
 Jonny Rödlund
 Giuseppe Rossi
 Mike Rowbotham
 David Sadler
 Robbie Savage
 Paul Scholes
 Jackie Scott
 Ryan Shawcross
 Paul Sixsmith
 Paddy Sloan
 Jonathan Spector
 Michael Stewart
 Nobby Stiles
 John Thorrington
 Dennis Viollet
 Danny Welbeck
 Billy Whelan
 Norman Whiteside
 Matty Willock
 Marc Wilson
 Jamie Wood
 Ron-Robert Zieler

Players of the Year
Prior to 1990, a single award was presented to the best young player of that season. Between 1982 and 1985 this was the entitled "Young Player of the Year"; the award then became known as the "Denzil Haroun Young Player of the Year" between 1986 and 1989 in honour of Denzil Haroun, a former club director and brother-in-law of former club chairman Louis Edwards.

Since 1990, individual awards are made to the best player of the Academy and the Reserves. The "Young Player of the Year" is named in honour of Jimmy Murphy, Sir Matt Busby's long-time assistant manager, who died in 1989, and the best reserve is awarded the "Denzil Haroun Reserve Player of the Year".

References

External links
Man Utd Under-21s (official site)
Man Utd Academy (official site)
Premier Reserve League North

Reserves and Academy
Football academies in England
Lancashire Combination
Lancashire League (football)
1878 establishments in England
Association football clubs established in 1878
Premier League International Cup
UEFA Youth League teams
NextGen series